Dignāja parish is an administrative unit of Jēkabpils Municipality, Latvia.

Towns, villages and settlements of Dignāja parish

References 

Parishes of Latvia
Jēkabpils Municipality